Abacetus aeneus is a species of ground beetle in the subfamily Pterostichinae. It was described by the famous French entomologist Pierre François Marie Auguste Dejean in 1828 and is found in Egypt and Cyprus.

References

aeneus
Beetles described in 1828
Insects of North Africa
Beetles of Cyprus